Warthin's tumor, also known as papillary cystadenoma lymphomatosum, is a benign cystic tumor of the salivary glands containing abundant lymphocytes and germinal centers (lymph node-like stroma). It is named for pathologist Aldred Scott Warthin, who described two cases in 1929.

Signs and symptoms
Warthin's tumor primarily affects older individuals (age 60–70 years). There is a slight male predilection according to recent studies. The tumor is slow growing, painless, and usually appears in the tail of the parotid gland near the angle of the mandible. In 5–14% of cases, Warthin's tumor is bilateral, but the two masses usually are at different times. Warthin's tumor is highly unlikely to become malignant.

Locations

The gland most likely affected is the parotid gland. In fact, it is the only tumor virtually restricted to the parotid gland. Warthin's tumor is the second most common benign parotid tumor after pleomorphic adenoma, but its prevalence is steadily increasing.

Cause
Its cause is unknown, but there is a strong association with cigarette smoking.  Smokers are at 8 times greater risk of developing Warthin's tumor than the general population.

Diagnosis
The appearance of this tumor under the microscope is unique. There are cystic spaces surrounded by two uniform rows of oncocytes, which are epithelial cells with abundant, granular, eosinophilic cytoplasm. The cystic spaces have epithelium referred to as papillary infoldings that protrude into them.  Additionally, the epithelium has lymphoid stroma with germinal center formation.

The differential diagnosis includes sebaceous lymphadenoma and oncocytoma.

Treatment
Most of these tumors are treated with surgical removal called parotidectomy. Contrary to pleomorphic adenoma, it is non recurrent.

See also 
 Pleomorphic adenoma

References

Additional sources
Kahn, Michael A. Basic Oral and Maxillofacial Pathology. Volume 1. 2001.

External links 

Salivary gland neoplasia
Benign neoplasms